Mário da Silva Mateus (born 3 September 1943), commonly known as Marinho, is a Portuguese retired footballer who played as a forward.

Club career
Born in Lisbon, Marinho started his career with local Atlético Clube de Portugal, making his Primeira Liga debut in the 1962–63 season and suffering relegation as second from bottom. Three of the following four years with the club were spent in the second division.

From 1966 until his retirement, 14 years later, Marinho only competed in the top level, with Atlético, Sporting CP, C.S. Marítimo and G.D. Estoril Praia. In the 1969–70 campaign, whilst with the second side, he scored a career-best 14 goals in 26 games to win the first of his two national championships; in 1979, he had a brief spell with the Toronto Blizzard of the North American Soccer League. For the remainder of the 1979 season he played in the National Soccer League with Toronto First Portuguese, and he previously played with First Portuguese for two months in 1977.

Marinho later took up coaching, being mainly associated with Sporting in various capacities. He acted as caretaker manager to the first team on two separate seasons, winning one match and drawing three in his four games in charge.

International career
Marinho earned five caps for Portugal, during six years. His first came on 2 November 1969, in a 1–1 away draw against Switzerland for the 1970 FIFA World Cup qualifiers.

|}

Personal life
Marinho's grandson, Mário Mateus, was also a footballer.

References

External links
 
 
 
 
 

1943 births
Living people
Footballers from Lisbon
Portuguese footballers
Association football forwards
Primeira Liga players
Liga Portugal 2 players
Atlético Clube de Portugal players
Sporting CP footballers
C.S. Marítimo players
G.D. Estoril Praia players
North American Soccer League (1968–1984) players
Toronto Blizzard (1971–1984) players
Toronto First Portuguese players
Portugal international footballers
Portuguese expatriate footballers
Expatriate soccer players in Canada
Portuguese expatriate sportspeople in Canada
Portuguese football managers
Primeira Liga managers
Sporting CP managers
Atlético Clube de Portugal managers
Canadian National Soccer League players